Forgive Me is the fourth studio album by Swedish singer Eric Saade. It was released on 28 August 2013 in Sweden through Roxy Recordings. 
In Sweden, the album debuted and peaked at number one on the Sverigetopplistan, becoming his third consecutive number one studio album there, since Saade Vol. 1 (2011). The album also marked a commercial success in Scandinavian countries, reaching the top 40 in Finland, Norway and Denmark.

The album has spawned six singles and one promotional single, including the hit single "Coming Home", which has accumulated more than 2.3 million streams on Spotify as of June 2020. Upon its release, Forgive Me generally received mixed reviews from music critics.

Background
Prior to this album, Saade had released three albums in the space of 18 months, and after almost a two-year break, he returned with Forgive Me, where he has co-written 12 of the 13 tracks.

Singles
"Coming Home" was released on 24 April 2013, as the lead single from the album. To promote the single, Saade embarked on the tour entitled Coming Home Tour from 25 May 2012 to 14 September 2012. The accompanying music video, was released on 24 June 2013, and has accumulated more than 1.9 million views on YouTube. Saade performed the song at the several music festivals and television shows including Allsång på Skansen and Nyhetsmorgon. The single generally received favorable reviews, some of which mentioned to the song's similarity to Usher's work.

The second single from the album, "Forgive Me" was released on 15 August 2013, with the accompanying music video released on the same day. The song was initially released as a part of an extended play, Coming Home EP.

"Flashy" was released on 23 August 2013 as the album's third single. Saade is featured as the guest vocalist on the song, while the Norwegian musician A-Lee being the lead artist. The artists performed the song on several television shows, including the Norwegian morning show, God Morgen Norge, to promote the song.

Saade released "Boomerang" on 1 November 2013 as the fourth and the last single from Forgive Me. The accompanying lyric video was released on 9 November 2013.

Promotional single
On 24 October 2012, "Miss Unknown" and "Marching (In the Name of Love)" were released as the promotional singles, and the accompanying music videos were released on 7 December 2012 and 12 December 2012 respectively. Saade performed the singles on several television appearances, including Svenska idrottsgalan, Musikhjälpen, and X Factor. "Marching (In the Name of Love)" was also included on Saade's first compilation album Eric Saade: Deluxe, which was released exclusively in Norway.

"Winning Ground" was released as a promotional single on 5 June 2013. The song served as the official theme for the football tournament, UEFA Women's Euro 2013, which was held at the Friends Arena in Stockholm. The song was met with favorable reviews, praising the song's catchiness.

Critical reception

Forgive Me received generally mixed to negative reviews from music critics. Deban Aderemi from Wiwibloggs rated the album 2.5 out of 5 points, and called the album an "artistic failure" and "an endurance test", while admitting that the album was a commercial success and highlighting "Flashy" as "a great pop tune". Sandeep Singh of Verdens Gang gave the album 3 out of 6 stars, pointing out the lack of personality reflected on the album.

Scandipop provided a favorable review, stating ""Miss Unknown" and the title track "Forgive Me" stop the album from being a totally perfect record [but] other than that though, it's a fantastic album. Not what we expected. And not what we thought we wanted either. But it's an accomplished record that showcases an extraordinary amount of progression in his sound, yet still serves as an enjoyable listen from start to finish, for someone who has been an Eric Saade fan from Day 1."

Track listing
Credits adapted from booklet.

Personnel
Credits for Forgive Me adapted from the booklet.

Musicians

Eric Saade - vocals
Jason Gill – recording engineer, guitar, backing vocals, programming
Beyond51 - recording engineer, keyboards, strings, additional vocals
Ground Rules - recording engineer, programming, mixing
Björn Engelmann - mastering
Mats Lindfors - mastering
Johan Kronlund - mixing, backing vocals
Element - mixing
Henrik Edenhed - mixing
Anders Hvenare - mixing
Anne Judith Wik - programming
Nermin Harambasic - programming
Julimar Santos - backing vocals
Cato Sundberg - guitar
Mattias Larsson - guitar, bass
Espen Berg - keyboards, programming, mixing
Simen M Eriksrud - keyboards, backing vocals, programming, mixing
Henrique Verissimo Silva - backing vocals
Sandra Bjurman - backing vocals
A-Lee - vocals

Non-musicians

Ricky Tillblad - design
Mikael Jylhä - design
Pia Börjlind - design
Fredrik Etoall - photography

Chart performance

Weekly charts

Year-end charts

Release history

References

2013 albums
Eric Saade albums
Universal Music Group albums